Dorothea Krook-Gilead (Hebrew: דורותיאה קרוק-גלעד b. 11 February 1920 d. 13 November 1989) was an Israeli literary scholar, translator, and professor of English literature at the University of Cambridge, the Hebrew University of Jerusalem and at Tel Aviv University.

Biography 
Krook was born in Riga, Latvia and moved to South Africa at the age of eight. She earned a degree in English literature at the University of Cape Town. In 1946 she was awarded a scholarship to Newnham College, at the University of Cambridge, where she earned her Ph.D. and spent 14 years as a research fellow and assistant lecturer. Among her students there was the poet Sylvia Plath, who wrote that Krook was her ideal of a successful career woman and wonderful human being. While at Newnham, Krook published her first major critical work, Three Traditions of Moral Thought.

In 1960, she emigrated to Israel and began teaching at the Hebrew University of Jerusalem in the Department of English Literature.

Krook married the poet Zerubavel Gilad in 1968 and became a member of Kibbutz Ein Harod. She translated many of his poems into English.

Krook died on 13 November 1989.

Awards and honours
 In 1973, Krook was awarded the Israel Prize in the humanities.
 In 1974, she became a member of the Israel Academy of Sciences and Humanities.

Published works 

Three traditions of moral thought New York, Cambridge University Press, 1959
The Ordeal of Consciousness in Henry James Cambridge, England 1962
Elements of tragedy Yale University Press, 1969 
John Sergeant and his circle: a study of three seventeenth-century English Aristotelians (with Beverly C. Southgate) E.J. Brill, 1993

See also 
 List of Israel Prize recipients

References 

1920 births
1989 deaths
Latvian Jews
Latvian emigrants to South Africa
South African Jews
South African emigrants to Israel
South African expatriates in the United Kingdom
South African people of Latvian-Jewish descent
20th-century Israeli Jews
University of Cape Town alumni
Alumni of Newnham College, Cambridge
Academics of the University of Cambridge
Academic staff of the Hebrew University of Jerusalem
Academic staff of Tel Aviv University
Israel Prize women recipients
Israel Prize in humanities recipients
Members of the Israel Academy of Sciences and Humanities
20th-century Israeli women writers
20th-century Israeli writers